Phoenix Equity Partners is a United Kingdom mid-market private equity firm. It specialises in working with management teams to help grow their businesses. It invests in companies valued at up to £150m.

History
Phoenix was co-founded in 2001 by Hugh Lenon, Sandy Muirhead and James Thomas. The firm is a result of a spin-off of DLJ European Private Equity from Credit Suisse First Boston.

The first iteration of Phoenix Equity Partners was a private equity management business through Phoenix Group, established in 1991 as a sister company to Phoenix Securities Limited. In 1997, when Phoenix Group was sold to Donaldson, Lufkin & Jenrette (DLJ), this asset followed and the team was renamed DLJ European Private Equity. When Credit Suisse First Boston (CSFB) acquired DLJ in November 2000, the DLJ European Private Equity team spinned off to form Phoenix Equity Partners.

The firm's first fund as Phoenix Equity Partners was called the Phoenix Continuation Fund, which raised £250 million from investors it retained from DLJ European Private Equity. In addition, CSFB committed £20 million to this new fund. The firm continued to manage the Phoenix Development Capital Fund, Phoenix Equity Partners II Fund, and DLJ Phoenix Equity Partners III fund.

References

External links
 Homepage
 Company information

Financial services companies established in 2001
Private equity firms of the United Kingdom